He Is Charming (French: Il est charmant) is a 1932 French musical comedy film directed by Louis Mercanton and starring Meg Lemonnier, Henri Garat and Louis Baron fils. It was one of a large number of operetta films made during the decade.

It was made at Joinville Studios by the French subsidiary of Paramount Pictures. A Swedish-language version Students in Paris was also released. The film's sets were designed by the art director René Renoux.

Cast
 Meg Lemonnier as Jacqueline Cordier 
 Henri Garat as Jacques Dombreval  
 Louis Baron fils as M. Poitou  
 Cassive as La présidente  
 Marthe Derminy as Mme de la Tremblade  
 Martine de Breteuil as Gaby 
 Suzette O'Nil as La dactylo  
 Dominique Bonnaud as Un Buste  
 Jacques Ferny as Un Buste  
 Vincent Hyspa as Un Buste  
 Gaston Secrétan as Un Buste  
 Paul Weil as Un Buste 
 Rochelle Carley as La capitaine des girls  
 Jean Mercanton as Le chasseur  
 Bazin as Antoine  
 Pierre Moreno as Ludovic de la Tremblade  
 Jean Granier as Un boy  
 Armand Dranem as Émile Barbarin 
 Lucienne Claudy
 Christiane Delyne
 Andrée Dorns 
 Madeleine Guitty 
 Yvette Lebon 
 Henri Niel 
 Erik Ode
 Nicole Ray as Petit rôle 
 Viviane Romance 
 Madeleine Rosetzky 
 Louisette Rousseau
 Pierre Sergeol

References

Bibliography 
 Waldman, Harry. Missing Reels: Lost Films of American and European Cinema. McFarland, 2000.

External links 
 

1932 films
1932 musical comedy films
French musical comedy films
Operetta films
1930s French-language films
Films directed by Louis Mercanton
Films shot at Joinville Studios
French multilingual films
French black-and-white films
1932 multilingual films
1930s French films